Kevin Robert Slates (born 1959) is a retired Rear Admiral in the United States Navy.

Early life and education
Slates is a native of Pewaukee, Wisconsin. He attended Marquette University, earning his bachelor's degree in 1982. Slates holds an M.S. degree in environmental engineering from the University of Maryland, College Park and has completed the Advanced Management Program at the Fuqua School of Business of Duke University.

Career
Slates received his commission in 1982. His duties would include commanding Naval Mobile Construction Battalion Three, deployments to serve in the Gulf War and as part of the Kosovo Force, being stationed at Marine Corps Base Camp Lejeune and being assigned to Naval Facilities Engineering Command and the staff of the Chief of Naval Operations. 

He retired in 2015. Awards he received during his career include the Legion of Merit.

References

1959 births
Living people
Place of birth missing (living people)
People from Pewaukee, Wisconsin
Marquette University alumni
Military personnel from Wisconsin
University of Maryland, College Park alumni
United States Navy personnel of the Gulf War
Fuqua School of Business alumni
Recipients of the Legion of Merit
United States Navy rear admirals (upper half)